Njuhe is a village in the municipality of Foča-Ustikolina, Bosnia and Herzegovina.

Demographics 
According to the 2013 census, its population was 110.

References

Populated places in Foča-Ustikolina